Fikkal or Phikkal Bazar ( is a former Village Development Committee (VDC) and now a part of Suryodaya Municipality (ward no.-10)  in Ilam District, Province No. 1 of Nepal.

This is a business hub of eastern Ilam. This city is directly linked by road to Darjeeling a hilly city of India situated in 58 Kilometers distance. It is on Mechi Highway (Highway No. 7) which is connected to Mahendra Highway (Highway No. 1) at Birtamod. Its distance from Birtamod is 40 km. 5 km north from Kanyam. Tea leaf, processed tea, ginger, broomsticks, cardamom etc. are the major trade items of this town.
Phikkal VDC was merged along with Kanyam and Panchakanya, Mechi together to form the new Municipality.

Phikkal has got weekly Haat on Thursdays' where local vendors and farmers gather to trade their products.

References

External links
UN map of the municipalities of Ilam District

Populated places in Ilam District
Bazaars in Nepal